The 2020 Campeonato Goiano  (officially the Campeonato Goiano de Profissionais da 1ª Divisão – Edição 2020) was the 77th edition of Goiás's top professional football league. The competition began on 22 January 2020 and ended on 27 February 2021.

On 17 March 2020, FGF suspended the Campeonato Goiano indefinitely due to the coronavirus pandemic in Brazil. Some months later, on 4 August 2020, they announced that the tournament would be resumed on 13 January 2021.

Atlético Goianiense, the defending champions, defeated Goianésia on penalties in the final, capturing their 15th title.

Participating teams

Format
In the first stage, the 12 teams were drawn into two groups of six teams each.

Each team played on a home-and-away two-legged basis against the six clubs from the other group. The teams were ranked according to points. If tied on points, the following criteria would be used to determine the ranking: 1. Wins; 2. Goal difference; 3. Goals scored; 4. Fewest red cards; 5. Fewest yellow cards; 6. Draw. This criteria also were used to determine the overall performance in the final stage.

The top eight teams in the first stage advanced to the quarter-finals, while the bottom two teams were relegated to the Divisão de Acesso (2ª Divisão) de 2021.

Originally, the final stage would be played on a home-and-away two-legged basis, but due to the coronavirus pandemic the final stage was played on a single-legged basis with the best overall performance team hosting the match. If the score was level, a penalty shoot-out would be used to determine the winner.

Champions qualified for the 2021 Copa do Brasil and 2021 Copa Verde, while runners-up and third place only qualified for the 2021 Copa do Brasil. Top three teams not already qualified for 2021 Série A, Série B or Série C qualified for 2021 Campeonato Brasileiro Série D.

First stage

Final stage

Bracket

Quarter-finals

|}

Group C

Atlético Goianiense qualified for the semi-finals.

Group D

Aparecidense qualified for the semi-finals.

Group E

Jaraguá qualified for the semi-finals.

Group F

Goianésia qualified for the semi-finals.

Semi-finals

|}

Group G

Atlético Goianiense qualified for the finals.

Group H

Goianésia qualified for the finals.

Final

General table

Top goalscorers

References

2020 in Brazilian football leagues
Campeonato Goiano seasons
Campeonato Goiano